Antonio Masini (c. 1639 - 20 September 1678) was born in Florence. During the last years of his life in Rome he was the Kapellmeister of the Cappela Giulia in Rome and furthermore the chamber musician of the former Queen of Sweden Kristina during her stay in Rome.

Biography 
During the years 1663 and 1664 his presence in Lucca and Ferrara is known. Furthermore a theatre performance in Ferrara in 1666 was mentioned. In accordance with a report he already had been in Rome in 1771. A request to pay a surgeon's bill is documented for the intended castration of a boy called Paolo Nanini in order to maintain his voice. In 1774 he advanced to be the director of music of the Cappella Giulia in Rome, additionally he was the maestro of the ensemble at the Confraternita della S. Casa di Loreto dei Marchigiani and at the church of S. Salvatore in Lauro. He kept this employment beginning with the year 1674 until his death in 1678. In February of 1678 he performed a play in the presence of the former Queen of Sweden. This so called  Comedia di Antonio Masini took place in the Casa di Monsù Ridò a Monte Brianzo. Obviously this could have been the opera Il Narciso. He was succeeded by Francesco Beretta. According to Baini, his burial place is S. Maria in Posterola.

Works 
His best known compositions are as follows:

 Il giuditio delle stagioni concerto musicale rappresentato nella solennità della Ss.ma Annuntiata, (performed at: scuole di S. Maria Cortelandini, Libretto: B. Beverini; Lucca 1663)
 L’Eumene (Oper, Libretto: A. Passarelli, performed in Ferrara at: teatro Bonacossi a S. Stefano, 1666)
 Il Narciso (obviously performed in presence of the former Queen of Sweden in 1678)

Furthermore there exist several oratorios and sacred songs (to be accompanied by Basso continuo) in the libraries of Naples, the Vatican, and in Bologna.

Further reading 
 F. D’Accone, Ancora su l’opera prima di Scarlatti e la regina, in Cristina di Svezia e la musica. Atti del convegno internazionale… 1996, Roma 1998, p. 80
 HEYINK, Rainer. Fest und Musik als Mittel kaiserlicher Machtpolitik. Das Haus Habsburg und die deutsche Nationalkirche in Rom S. Maria dell’Anima. Tutzing: Schneider, 2010
 S. Monaldini, L’orto dell’Esperidi. Musici, attori e artisti nel patrocinio della famiglia Bentivoglio (1646-1685)
 The New Grove Dict. of music and musicians, XVI, p. 30

References

Weblinks 
 https://www.treccani.it/enciclopedia/antonio-masini_(Dizionario-Biografico)

1630s births
1678 deaths

Year of birth uncertain
Musicians from Rome
Italian male classical composers
Italian Baroque composers
Sacred music composers
17th-century Italian composers
17th-century male musicians